Bágyogszovát is a village in Győr-Moson-Sopron county, Hungary, in the north-western region, 35 kilometers from Győr, in the direction of Sopron, near Route 85, the main route of the county.

The first known written records of Bágyogszovát are from the 13th century. According to those documents, the first part of the village was founded in 1224, and was named Zooac. This name was changed to Szovát during later centuries. The village was the property of the bishop of Győr for more than five centuries. The other part of the village, Bágyog was founded later, but the exact date is not known. It was originally called Baguc. The two parts of the village were joined soon after World War II creating Bágyogszovát.

References

External links 
 Street map 

Populated places in Győr-Moson-Sopron County